Tim Ross is an Australian actor best known for having played Steve Beaumont in Wonderland. He has also appeared in the television series Neighbours, Rush, Mrs Biggs and the telemovie Underbelly Files: Tell Them Lucifer was Here.

In 2017, Ross joined the cast of Home and Away, playing James Mayvers, the love interest of Roo Stewart played by Georgie Parker. Tim’s first lead in a feature film was the role of Simon Cook in Romance On The Menu aka Hearts Down Under with Cindy Busby which aired on both Netflix and the Hallmark Channel

References

External links 
 

Living people
21st-century Australian male actors
20th-century Australian male actors
Place of birth missing (living people)
Year of birth missing (living people)
Male actors from Sydney